The 1919 South American Championship of Nations was the third continental championship for South American national football teams. It was held in Rio de Janeiro, Brazil from 11 to 29 May 1919.

The participating countries were Brazil, Argentina, Chile and Uruguay as the defending champion.

After finishing tied in the group standings on points, host Brazil beat Uruguay in the playoff match to win their first title.

The playoff was the longest match in the competition's history, and under current rules, will remain so indefinitely: with the score tied 0-0 after 90 minutes had expired, both captains and the referee agreed to play an extra time period of two 15-minute halves. When 120 minutes expired with the score still tied 0-0, both captains and the referee agreed to play a second extra time period of two 15-minute halves; thus, the playoff match lasted 150 minutes.

Format
There was no qualifying for the tournament. The participating countries were Argentina, Brazil, Chile and Uruguay. All teams competed between each other in a single group. Two points were awarded for a win, one for a draw and zero for a defeat. If there was a tie of points at the top of the standings, a playoff match would be held to determine the champion.

Squads
For a complete list of participating squads see: 1919 South American Championship squads

Venues

Final round
Each team played one match against each of the other teams. Two points were awarded for a win, one point for a draw and zero points for a defeat.

Play-off

Result

Goal scorers

4 goals

  Arthur Friedenreich
  Neco

3 goals

  Edwin Clarcke
  Carlos Izaguirre
  Carlos Scarone

2 goals
  Isabelino Gradín

1 goal

  Amílcar
  Haroldo
  Héitor
  Millon
  Alfredo France
  José Pérez
  Héctor Scarone

Own goals
  Manuel Varela (for Argentina)

Aftermath
The day after the final, Uruguayan goalkeeper Roberto Chery died in hospital in Río de Janeiro of a strangulated hernia; he had been injured after attempting to stop a goal during the match against Chile. As substitutions were not allowed at the time, Chery had to play the rest of the match while severely injured.

Brazil and Uruguay had scheduled a friendly match ("Copa Rio Branco") for 19 June 1919, but following Chery's tragic death, the Uruguayan team declined to play. Argentina offered to replace the Uruguayan side, which the Brazilian Federation accepted, and the match was played as the  "Copa Roberto Chery" to honor the late Uruguayan goalkeeper. Argentina entered the field wearing Uruguay's traditional light-blue jersey, while Brazil wore the jersey of Uruguayan club Peñarol.

References

 
1919
1919 in Brazilian football
1919
1919
1919 in South American football
1919 in Chilean sport
1919 in Uruguayan football
1919 in Argentine football
May 1919 sports events
20th century in Rio de Janeiro